Kiernan Peter Hughes-Mason (born 22 October 1991) is an English professional footballer who plays as a winger or striker for Tower Hamlets, where he is also the joint-manager.

He notably played professional football for Millwall, Cheltenham Town and Grimsby Town, as well as having brief spells in New Zealand with North Wellington and Tasman United. He has spent most of his career in non-league football and has played for Tooting & Mitcham United, Chelmsford City, Kettering Town,  Welling United, Concord Rangers, Hayes & Yeading United, Maidstone United, Leatherhead, Walton Casuals, Hastings United, Grays Athletic, Barking, Hythe Town, Hashtag United, Saffron Walden Town and Tilbury.

Club career

Youth career 
Hughes-Mason started his career at the age of seven, playing alongside Jack Wilshere and Emmanuel Frimpong in the youth ranks at Arsenal. At the age of 14, he was deemed too small by the club and released. He then joined local rivals Tottenham Hotspur for a season but failed to earn a scholarship at the club. Following his release, Hughes-Mason was offered a scholarship with Millwall.

Professional career 
After two years in the youth section, Hughes-Mason made his professional debut for Millwall in August 2009 and the age of 17. Named on the bench the following game, he struggled to break into the team and joined Cheltenham Town in April 2010. However, he failed to make an appearance for the League Two club, where he remained until the end of the season.

In July 2010, Hughes-Mason went on trial with Swindon Town alongside PSG forward Yoann Arquin but was unable to impress and later returned to Millwall. In August 2010, he joined Tooting & Mitcham United on a one-month loan, before returning for a second spell in November 2010.

In February 2011, Hughes-Mason joined Conference South outfit Chelmsford City on loan and made six appearances in the latter stages of the season. At the end of the 2010–11 season, he was released by Millwall.

Hughes-Mason trialed with Burton Albion in July 2011, and Grimsby Town two weeks later, but was unable to earn a contract with either club.

Semi-professional career 
In August 2011, Hughes-Mason re-joined Tooting & Mitcham United on non-contract terms, before earning a move to Kettering Town in October 2011. Despite his previously unsuccessful trial, he returned to Conference Premier club Grimsby Town in January 2012, and remained with the club until the end of the season.

In May 2012, the striker completed a move to Conference South side Welling United, where he earned promotion back to the Premier division in his inaugural season with the club. Scoring 11 league goals and making 49 appearances in all competitions during the season, he couldn't have the same impact in his second campaign. Hughes-Mason made 15 league appearances during the 2013-14 season, and joined Concord Rangers on loan in December 2013. He also had a brief loan at Hayes & Yeading United, scoring once in three appearances.

Following his departure from Welling United late into the season, Hughes-Mason joined Maidstone United for the remainder of the campaign, making nine league appearances.

In July 2014, he joined league Isthmian Premier Division rivals Leatherhead. A successful first season saw Hughes-Mason feature regularly for the recently promoted club with 21 goals in all competitions. He remained in the first team set-up the following season with 14 goals, and added another two to his tally during the 2016–17 season. Continuing to feature regularly under newly appointed manager Jimmy Bullard, he recorded 14 appearances in all competitions prior to his departure.

In October 2016, Hughes-Mason joined Isthmian Division One South side Walton Casuals. He scored his first goal for the club in his second appearance, netting in a 3–2 win over Hastings United.

In November 2016, he was snapped up by league rivals Hastings United. Hughes-Mason scored on his debut with a 90th-minute goal in a 7–0 victory at Chatham Town, and opened the scoring three days later when making his home debut in a 3–0 win over Greenwich Borough.

After a season with Barking, where he scored ten goals, Hughes-Mason left the club to move to New Zealand and join North Wellington. He then joined New Zealand Premiership side Tasman United ahead of the new campaign.

He returned to England in 2019 to re-sign for Barking, before signing for Hythe Town in September 2019.

In 2020, Hughes-Mason became the manager for the newly formed Hashtag United reserve team. On 19 October 2020, he made his debut for the first team as a 75th-minute substitute for striker George Smith against Clapton, scoring a goal in the 90th minute.

On 6 June 2022, Saffron Walden Town announced the signing of Hughes-Mason from Hashtag United. He made his league debut in their first game of the season, a 2-1 win against Clapton.

International career
Hughes-Mason was born in the London Borough of Hackney, and is of Antigua and Barbudan, Dominican and Grenadian descent. In August 2012, he was called up to the Antigua and Barbuda Under-20 squad, who he qualifies for through his mother, for the 2013 CONCACAF U-20 Championship qualifiers against Dominica, Grenada and Curaçao. However, when Hughes-Mason reported to the games, he was unable to play due to a mix-up regarding eligibility as he did not meet the age criteria.

Managerial career
On 7 February 2023, Hughes-Mason joined Tower Hamlets as joint-manager.

Personal life
During his spell with Welling United, Hughes-Mason divided his time studying sports coaching at the University of East London and coaching football at St. Francis' Catholic Primary School in Stratford, London.

References

External links

Kiernan Hughes-Mason at The FA
Profile at Aylesbury United

1991 births
Living people
Footballers from the London Borough of Hackney
English footballers
English sportspeople of Antigua and Barbuda descent
English people of Dominica descent
English sportspeople of Grenadian descent
Association football forwards
English Football League players
National League (English football) players
Isthmian League players
New Zealand Football Championship players
Millwall F.C. players
Cheltenham Town F.C. players
Tooting & Mitcham United F.C. players
Chelmsford City F.C. players
Kettering Town F.C. players
Grimsby Town F.C. players
Welling United F.C. players
Concord Rangers F.C. players
Hayes & Yeading United F.C. players
Maidstone United F.C. players
Leatherhead F.C. players
Walton Casuals F.C. players
Hastings United F.C. players
Grays Athletic F.C. players
Barking F.C. players
North Wellington players
Tasman United players
Hythe Town F.C. players
Hashtag United F.C. players
English football managers
English expatriate footballers
English expatriate sportspeople in New Zealand
Expatriate association footballers in New Zealand
Saffron Walden Town F.C. players
Tilbury F.C. players
Tower Hamlets F.C. players